Astyris is a genus of sea snails, marine gastropod molluscs in the family Columbellidae, the dove snails.

Species
Species within the genus Astyris include:

 Astyris amiantis Dall, 1919
 Astyris amphissella  (Dall, 1881)
 Astyris angeli Espinosa, Fernandez-Garcès & Ortea, 2004
 Astyris appressa Dall, 1927
 Astyris bonariensis Castellanos & Deambrosi, 1967
 Astyris costata Gulbin, 1983
 Astyris crumena Dall, 1924
 Astyris delannoyei Pelorce, 2013
 Astyris diaphana A. E. Verrill, 1882
 Astyris elegans Gulbin, 1983
 Astyris embusa Dall, 1927
 Astyris enida Dall, 1927
 Astyris euribia Dall, 1927
 Astyris frumarkernorum Garcia, 2009
 Astyris georgiana Dall, 1927
 Astyris hervillardi Pelorce, 2012
 Astyris hypodra (Dall, 1916)
 Astyris joseantonioi Espinosa & Ortea, 2014 
 Astyris kobai Golikov & Kussakin, 1962
 Astyris labecula Gould, 1862
 Astyris lunata (Say, 1826)
 Astyris multilineata (Dall, 1889)
 Astyris perlucida Dall, 1927
 Astyris profundi (Dall, 1889)
 Astyris projecta Dall, 1927
 Astyris pura A. E. Verrill, 1882
 Astyris raveneli (Dall, 1889)
 Astyris rolani Espinosa, Fernandez-Garcès & Ortea, 2004
 Astyris rosacea (Gould, 1840)
 Astyris sagenata Dall, 1927
 Astyris salmonea (Barnard, 1963)
 Astyris stemma Dall, 1927
 Astyris suavis (Smith, 1906)
 Astyris verrilli (Dall, 1881)
 Astyris vidua Dall, 1924

Species brought into synonymy
 Astyris antares (P. M. Costa & P. J. de Souza, 2001): synonym of Mitrella antares P. M. Costa & P. J. de Souza, 2001
 Astyris aurantiaca Dall, 1871: synonym of Alia aurantiaca (Dall, 1871)
 Astyris caletae Preston, 1915: synonym of Alia unifasciata (G. B. Sowerby I, 1832)
 Astyris gausapata (Gould, 1850): synonym of Alia gausapata (Gould, 1850)
 Astyris hartmanni Espinosa & Ortea, 2014: synonym of Minimanachis hartmanni (Espinosa & Ortea, 2014)
 Astyris permodesta (Dall, 1890): synonym of Alia permodesta (Dall, 1890)
 Astyris tuberosa (Carpenter, 1865): synonym of Mitrella tuberosa (Carpenter, 1865)
 Astyris zonalis Gould, 1848: synonym of Astyris lunata (Say, 1826)

References

External links
 Adams H. & Adams A. (1853-1858). The genera of recent Mollusca; arranged according to their organization. London, van Voorst. Vol. 1: xl + 484 pp.; vol. 2: 661 pp.; vol. 3: 138 pls. Published in parts: Vol. 1: i-xl (1858), 1-256 (1853), 257-484 (1854). Vol. 2: 1-92 (1854), 93-284 (1855), 285-412 (1856), 413-540 (1857), 541-661 (1858). Vol. 3: pl. 1-32 (1853), 33-96 (1855), 97-112 (1856), 113-128 (1857), 129-138 (1858) 

Columbellidae
Gastropod genera